The World Doctors Orchestra (WDO) is an orchestra made up entirely of physicians. It was established as a non-profit organization in 2008 by Prof. Stefan Willich at the Charité University Medical Center in Berlin, Germany with the purpose of combining music with global medical responsibility. The proceeds from every concert session go to selected non-profit medical aid organizations.

References

External links
World Doctors Orchestra official site
"Operation Klassik" a 2008 article in Der Tagesspiegel

Musical groups established in 2007
German orchestras
Music in Berlin
Medical and health organisations based in Berlin
Medical associations based in the United States